Yanomamia hoogmoedi is a species of lizard in the family Gymnophthalmidae. It is endemic to Guyana.

References

Yanomamia
Reptiles of Guyana
Endemic fauna of Guyana
Reptiles described in 2008
Taxa named by Philippe J.R. Kok
Taxobox binomials not recognized by IUCN